Auli Kiskola (born 12 February 1995) is a Finnish biathlete. She represented Finland at the Junior World championships in 2012, 2013 and 2015, and at the Biathlon World Championships 2015 in Kontiolahti.

References

External links 
 

1995 births
Living people
Finnish female biathletes
Place of birth missing (living people)